Kawaokaohele (Hawaiian for "our days of poverty") was a High Chief who ruled the island of Maui in ancient Hawaii.

Biography 
Kawaokaohele was a son of Kahekili I and Haukanuimakamaka, who was a High Chiefess and is also known as Hauanuihonialawahine. She was born on Kauai, but married Kahekili on Maui. Kawaokaohele succeeded his father. His reign was prosperous. No war occurred during Kawaokaohele was ruler of the island.

Kawaokaohele’s sister, beautiful Keleanohoanaapiapi, was abducted and married into the noble family of Oahu.

Marriage 
Kawaokaohele had married Kepalaoa, whose pedigree is not remembered, but who was probably a Maui chiefess or an Oahu princess. She bore a famous son, Piʻilani, and Kawaokaohele was succeeded by him.

Legend 
In one ancient legend, Kawaokaohele is represented as the foster father of Piʻilani.

According to this old story, god Kū was the biological father of  Piʻilani.

Family tree

Notes 

Royalty of Maui